Yang Rong (born 1957), also known as Yung Yeung and Benjamin Yeung is an exiled Chinese tycoon. He was born in Shanghai in 1957. Only a year after the magazine Forbes proclaimed him China's third richest businessman in 2001, Yang fled to the US following a dispute with the Chinese government.

Famous for his close association with a Chinese microvan manufacturer, Yang has continued to be involved in the automotive industry since his flight to the US. There, his ventures have yet to achieve the same scale of success as those in his native China have done.

In the US, Yang has been involved with at least two businesses, Greentech Automotive and Hybrid Kinetic Motors. The latter is a hybrid vehicle company with an aim of manufacturing cars in Alabama, and the former planned to build all-electric vehicles in Mississippi. Hybrid Kinetic later dropped its Alabama plans due to a funding shortfall in 2009, and Yang has distanced himself from his other American venture, Greentech Automotive.

Brilliance Auto

Yang, the founding chairman of Brilliance Auto, was involved with the company during the 1990s.

Some blame his immigration to the US on a failed bid to locate a production base in Ningbo. As Ningbo is near the rich coastal city of Shanghai, this was contrary to Chinese state policy encouraging economic growth in the poorer regions, and Yang incurred the wrath of the government of Liaoning in the attempt. In 2002 he was accused of embezzlement, and an arrest warrant was issued precipitating Yang's flight from the country.

While Yang was in control, Brilliance Auto Group made a number of IPOs. These included listing a subsidiary Brilliance Auto on the New York Stock Exchange in 1992, the same subsidiary again on the Stock Exchange of Hong Kong (SEHK) in 1999, and  that same year a takeover another listed company Shenhua Holdings on the Shanghai Stock Exchange.

Hybrid Kinetic Motors and other ventures
After leaving China in  2002, Rong began a start-up car company in the United States, Hybrid Kinetic Motors Corporation. While its desire to manufacture in the US did not come to fruition, in the early 2010s the company expressed interest in several Mainland China production base sites and in 2013 broke ground for a new facility in the Lianyungang Economic and Technological Development Zone, Lianyungang prefecture, which may produce batteries and become operational in 2018.

JAC joint venture
As of 2010 the company will enter a possible joint venture with Jianghuai Automobile selling parts in China for use in green technology vehicles. A  Tianjin, Shandong province, production base will be complete by 2013, and while the original intent was to manufacture whole vehicles, this JV will only supply parts.

2009 Alabama factory plan
As of 2009 the possibility of producing Hybrid Kinetic vehicles at an undeveloped site in Baldwin County, Alabama, was discussed.

2009 Mississippi factory plan

Here, plans for an auto factory fell through  amid a weak American economy.

2017 Inks $68 Million Collaboration with Pininfarina

Collaboration agreement was reached totaling $68 million with Pininfarina design firm for a total term length of 46 months. According to this agreement, "Pininfarina will support Hybrid Kinetic in the turnkey development of an electric car from the styling concept and development of the vehicle to the engineering development and virtual and physical validation for series production" During this development, some of the vehicles in development include the following:

 H600 4 Seater Sedan
 K550 5 Seater SUV
 K750 7 Seater SUV
 HK GT 4 Seater GT
 K350 4 Seater Sedan
 H500 4 Seater Sedan

References

External links
Hybrid Kinec Motors Official Site

Brilliance Auto
Chinese founders of automobile manufacturers
Businesspeople from Wuxi
1957 births
Living people